Nicolas Klotz (born 22 June 1954) is a French filmmaker born in Neuilly-sur-Seine, Hauts-de-Seine.

Filmography
Rendez-vous avec Marguerite 1983
The Bengali Night 1988 with Hugh Grant, Shabana Azmi and Soumitra Chatterjee
La Nuit sacrée 1993 with Goran Bregović
Chants of Sand and Stars 1996
Pariah (Paria) 2000
The Wound (La Blessure) 2004
Dans la peau de... Paulo Branco (2005) (TV)
Heartbeat Detector (La Question humaine) 2007
Low Life  2011

External links

French film directors
1954 births
Living people
People from Neuilly-sur-Seine